Weijian Shan (born 1954) is a Chinese economist, businessman, and author based in Hong Kong. Shan is chairman and CEO of PAG and the author of Out of the Gobi: My Story of China and America. Prior to PAG, he served as TPG Capital’s senior partner and JP Morgan’s China chief representative.

Biography 
Born in China in 1954, Shan was raised in the midst of the Cultural Revolution, during which Mao Zedong closed all universities and dispatched youngsters to the countryside. In 1969, Shan was sent to Inner Mongolia where he spent 6 years in the Gobi desert. He returned to Beijing in 1975 to study English at the Beijing Institute of Foreign Trade (now University of International Business and Economics) and later moved to the United States among the first PRC students to study abroad after the Cultural Revolution. He first attended the University of San Francisco in 1980 where he earned an MBA, before continuing his study at the University of California, Berkeley for a masters in economics and a doctorate in business.

In 1987, Shan worked at the World Bank in Washington, DC as an investment officer. He taught at the Wharton School of the University of Pennsylvania for 6 years, where he founded the China Economic Review. He held various positions at JP Morgan between 1993 and 1998 in China, and joined TPG Capital thereafter.

Shan is a frequent contributor to journals and newspapers. His commentary on the Chinese economy has appeared in The New York Times, Financial Times, and WSJ. His memoir, Out of the Gobi: My Story of China and America, was published by Wiley in January 2019 and became a national bestseller in February 2019.

References

External links 
 
 Weijian Shan at Bloomberg.com
 bookdepository.com

1954 births
Living people
Economists from Beijing
Chinese venture capitalists
Business and financial journalists
Hong Kong chief executives
University of San Francisco alumni
University of California, Berkeley alumni
Wharton School of the University of Pennsylvania faculty
Writers from Beijing
Businesspeople from Beijing
Educators from Beijing